Patricia Elena Retamoza Vega (born 31 March 1959) is a Mexican politician affiliated with the PRI. As of 2013 she served as Deputy of the LXII Legislature of the Mexican Congress representing Jalisco.

References

1959 births
Living people
Politicians from Jalisco
Women members of the Chamber of Deputies (Mexico)
Institutional Revolutionary Party politicians
21st-century Mexican politicians
21st-century Mexican women politicians
University of Guadalajara alumni
Academic staff of the University of Guadalajara
Deputies of the LXII Legislature of Mexico
Members of the Chamber of Deputies (Mexico) for Jalisco